Chikashi (written: , , ,  or ) is a masculine Japanese given name. Notable people with the name include:

, Japanese ice hockey player
, Japanese poet
, Japanese footballer
, Japanese football manager
, Japanese biophysicist

Japanese masculine given names